The Apalachee Correctional Institution, East Unit  is a state prison for men located in Sneads, Jackson County, Florida, owned and operated by the Florida Department of Corrections.  This facility has a mix of security levels, including minimum, medium, and close, and houses adult male offenders.  Apalachee Correctional Institution East Unit first opened in 1949 and has a maximum capacity of 1322 prisoners.

References

Prisons in Florida
Buildings and structures in Jackson County, Florida
1949 establishments in Florida